Heterodeltis is a genus of moths in the family Lecithoceridae.

Species
 Heterodeltis trichroa (Meyrick, 1906)
 Heterodeltis mentella (Felder & Rogenhofer, 1875)

References

Natural History Museum Lepidoptera genus database

Lecithocerinae
Moth genera